Albac may refer to the following places in Romania:

Albac, a commune in Alba County
Albac (Arieș), a tributary of the Arieșul Mare in Alba County
Albac (Hârtibaciu), a tributary of the Hârtibaciu in Sibiu County